Nevada Smith is an American professional basketball coach.

Career 
Smith played collegiately at Bethany College, scoring 1,255 points during his four-year tenure (1998–2002), good for a fifth place on the school's all-time scoring list. As a junior, he ranked first in the nation in three-pointers per game, he hit a total of 313 shots from long range during his college career, which ranked him 13th among all NCAA Division 3 players. After graduating with a degree in sports management from Bethany College in 2002, he pursued a master's degree, which he earned from St. Lawrence University in 2004.

He served as assistant coach at St. Lawrence from 2002 to 2004 and was named head coach at State University of New York at Canton for the 2004–05 campaign. In 2005–06, Smith was an assistant coach and head junior varsity coach at Allegheny College. From 2006 to 2011, he served as assistant coach at Ithaca College and took over the head coaching job at Keystone College in 2011.

He left Keystone for the NBA D-League in 2013, taking over as head coach of the Rio Grande Valley Vipers. During his two-year tenure, he guided the Vipers to a 57–43 record.

In 2016, Smith returned as a head coach of another D-League team, the Sioux Falls Skyforce. He spent three seasons with the Miami Heat's affiliate, earning a 78–72 record and no playoff appearances.

In September 2020, Smith was named Director of Program Development for the Texas Longhorns.

References

External links 
 usbasket profile

1981 births
Living people
Allegheny Gators men's basketball coaches
American men's basketball coaches
American men's basketball players
Basketball coaches from Pennsylvania
Basketball players from Pennsylvania
Bethany Bison men's basketball players
People from Vandergrift, Pennsylvania
Rio Grande Valley Vipers coaches
Sioux Falls Skyforce coaches
Sportspeople from the Pittsburgh metropolitan area
St. Lawrence Saints men's basketball coaches